Shopgirl is a 2005 American romantic comedy-drama film directed by Anand Tucker and starring Steve Martin, Claire Danes, and Jason Schwartzman. The screenplay by Steve Martin is based on his 2000 novella of the same title. The film is about a complex love triangle between a bored salesgirl, a wealthy businessman, and an aimless young man.
Produced by Ashok Amritraj, Jon Jashni, and Steve Martin for Touchstone Pictures and Hyde Park Entertainment, and distributed in the United States by Buena Vista Pictures and internationally by 20th Century Fox. Shopgirl was released on October 21, 2005, and received positive reviews from film critics. The film went on to earn $11,112,077 and was nominated for four Satellite Awards, including Best Picture and Best Adapted Screenplay.

Plot 
In 2003, Mirabelle Buttersfield is an aspiring artist from Vermont who works at the evening gloves counter at Saks Fifth Avenue, Beverly Hills. Her quiet, orderly existence filled with both the mundane – futon furniture and an aging pickup truck – and the serious – a large student loan and a supply of antidepressants – is disrupted by the sudden appearance of two disparate men.

Jeremy is an immature, socially inept, penniless graphic designer for an amplifier manufacturer and an aspiring typographer who meets Mirabelle in a laundromat. Mirabelle, aching for meaningful contact, gives Jeremy a chance but it quickly fizzles after a halfhearted date, followed by a woefully underwhelming sexual encounter.

Ray Porter is an older, suave, wealthy, divorced logician who charms Mirabelle over several dates, one of which ends at his house. Mirabelle offers herself to him, and the morning after they have sex, Ray tells her that he does not intend for their relationship to be serious due to his constant travel between Los Angeles and Seattle. Each has a different understanding of this talk: Ray tells his psychiatrist that Mirabelle knows he will see other people, and Mirabelle tells her acquaintances that Ray wants to see her more.

Mirabelle and Ray embark on a lengthy affair, while Jeremy attempts to have one last liaison with Mirabelle before leaving as a roadie for the band Hot Tears, but she spurns him due to her relationship with Ray. While on tour, the band's lead singer introduces Jeremy to the world of self-improvement and how to better relate to the opposite sex. Mirabelle becomes increasingly devoted to Ray, who showers her with expensive gifts, such as paying off her student loans, instead of emotional affection. When Mirabelle's depression hits hard, as she has ceased taking her antidepressants because Ray makes her happy, he takes her to the doctor and cares for her, further deepening her reliance on him. Ray invites Mirabelle on a trip to New York, and has her fitted in the dress shop at Armani.

During a business trip, Ray has dinner with an old girlfriend who propositions him and he accepts, confessing the liaison to Mirabelle. Devastated, Mirabelle ends the relationship, abandons her trip to New York, and visits Vermont instead. While she basks in the warmth and familiarity of home, Ray calls to apologize for hurting her and asks her to meet him in New York. There, he takes her to a large party where she is the youngest guest and feels alone and out of place. At the hotel room, Ray wants to be intimate but Mirabelle rejects him.

Returning to California, Mirabelle encounters Jeremy on the way to an art show, and they arrive together. Her coworker Lisa, suspicious of Mirabelle’s new clothes, mistakes Jeremy for Ray, and Jeremy's self-improvement is obvious to everyone but Mirabelle. Lisa seduces Jeremy as they go back to her place and have sex. Mirabelle goes home with Ray. In the morning, Ray devastates Mirabelle by announcing his plans to find a bigger house in case he meets someone and decides to have kids. Jeremy calls Lisa, but learns she has no interest in anything but Ray Porter and his money.

Mirabelle permanently ends her relationship with Ray and, after a brief period of mourning, quits her job at Saks to become a receptionist in an art gallery. Jeremy pursues her again, properly, and they fall in love. Mirabelle is invited to show her work at the gallery, and Ray attends the opening with his new girlfriend, a gynecologist. Jeremy is clearly proud of Mirabelle, and their relationship is in stark contrast to Ray and Mirabelle, whose conversation is full of recognition yet noticeably strained. Ray apologizes for how deeply he hurt her and admits that he did love her and Mirabelle is visibly touched by his admission, and runs lovingly into Jeremy's arms. Watching the healthy, openly loving couple, Ray remarks that he feels a loss even though he had kept Mirabelle "at arm's length" to avoid the pain of their inevitable breakup.

Cast
 Steve Martin as Ray Porter
 Claire Danes as Mirabelle Buttersfield
 Jason Schwartzman as Jeremy
 Bridgette Wilson-Sampras as Lisa Cramer
 Sam Bottoms as Dan Buttersfield
 Frances Conroy as Charlotte Buttersfield
 Rebecca Pidgeon as Christie Richards
 Samantha Shelton as Loki
 Gina Doctor as Del Ray
 Clyde Kusatsu as Mr. Agasa

Production notes
In Steve Martin's original novella, Mirabelle was employed by Neiman Marcus. According to Evolution of a Novella: The Making of Shopgirl, a bonus feature on the DVD release, Saks Fifth Avenue actively pursued participation in the film by presenting a proposal to the producers and director and promising full cooperation with filming schedules. The gloves in the counter are not from Saks, but a boutique in Toronto, where some of the film was shot.

According to Martin's book Born Standing Up, there are many parallels to Martin's own life.  Early in his career, he lost a girlfriend to an older, suave gentleman resembling Ray Porter, real-life Mason Williams. Williams had a house that matches the description of Ray Porter's, it overlooked Los Angeles from roughly the same vantage point and the descriptions of the two houses are the same. Williams was an actuary at one point, whereas Porter was a logician. Martin and Williams both vied for the attention of a girlfriend, Nina. The relationship ended when Martin, much like the Schwartzman character, goes on a cross-country tour as a roadie. These parallels make the novella somewhat autobiographical.

In addition, Mirabelle is partially based on artist Allyson Hollingsworth, who was a consultant to the movie and had a relationship with Martin in the 90s. Photographs and drawings attributed to Mirabelle in the movie are by Hollingsworth.

Martin had Tom Hanks in mind for the role of Ray Porter at the time he was writing the screenplay, but director Anand Tucker felt that Martin was so close to the material and had such a strong understanding of the character that Martin should play the part himself. After auditioning numerous actresses, he knew Claire Danes was perfect for the role of Mirabelle as soon as she began reading lines with Martin. He found Jeremy much more difficult to cast, and remembered Jason Schwartzman (but not his name) from his performance in Rushmore only two weeks before filming was scheduled to begin.

The apartment building used for Mirabelle's residence is located at 1630 Griffith Park Boulevard in Los Angeles.

The songs "Lily & Parrots", "Carry Me Ohio" and "Make Like Paper" were written and performed by Mark Kozelek. Tucker remembered him from his appearance in Almost Famous and cast him as the lead singer of Hot Tears. Both "Carry Me Ohio" and "Lily and Parrots" were tracks on Ghosts of the Great Highway, the first CD released by Kozelek's real-life band Sun Kil Moon. "Make Like Paper" was a track from Songs for a Blue Guitar, an album by Kozelek's earlier band Red House Painters.
 
The film premiered at the Toronto International Film Festival in September 2005. It was shown at the Chicago International Film Festival and the Austin Film Festival before going into limited release in the US.

The film grossed $10,284,523 in the US and $1,303,682 in foreign markets for a total worldwide box office of $11,588,205.

Critical reception
On Rotten Tomatoes the film has an approval rating of 61% based on 155 reviews, with an average rating of 6.30/10. The site's consensus states: "Shopgirl is precariously slight, but it has some intriguing moments, and Danes is luminous." On Metacritic it has a score of 62 out of 100 based on 37 reviews. Audiences surveyed by CinemaScore gave the film a grade "B−" on scale of A to F.

Roger Ebert gave the film 3.5 out of 4 stars.

In his review in The New York Times, A. O. Scott called the film "elegant and exquisitely tailored ... both funny and sweetly sad" and added, "[It] is a resolutely small movie, finely made and perhaps a bit fragile. Under the pressure of too much thought, it might buckle and splinter; the characters might look flimsy, their comings and goings too neatly engineered, their lovability assumed rather than proven. And it's true that none of them are perfect. From where I sit, though, the film they inhabit comes pretty close."

Mick LaSalle of the San Francisco Chronicle described it as "a film of wisdom, emotional subtlety and power ... directed with a rare combination of delicacy and decisiveness."

In Variety, Joe Leydon observed, "Martin hits all the right notes while subtly conveying both the appealing sophistication and the purposeful reserve of Ray. But he cannot entirely avoid being overshadowed by Danes' endearingly vulnerable, emotionally multifaceted and fearlessly open performance. (In a few scenes, she appears so achingly luminescent it's almost heartbreaking to watch her.) The two stars bring out the very best in each other, particularly in a poignant final scene."

Carina Chocano of the Los Angeles Times said the film is "like Pygmalion for the upper-middle-brow business class flier. Which isn't to say it's bad. On the contrary, it's smart, spare, elegant and understated ... Danes can fill a scene with one wounded glance, and her body language alone conveys a richness of character that makes an otherwise not very expressive character mesmerizing."

In Rolling Stone, Peter Travers rated it three out of four stars and commented, "The May–December thing worked in Lost in Translation and it works here, thanks to the perceptive and gracefully romantic script that Martin has adapted from his novella. This is not the wild-and-crazy Martin of Bringing Down the House, this is the Martin who writes for The New Yorker with erudition and wit."

Steve Persall of the St. Petersburg Times graded the film C and called it "too slight to be considered a movie yet padded enough to pose as a feature-length work ... The blessing and curse of cinema is its ability to compress ideas into simple images. When the ideas are this simple, cinema crushes them to dullness. Mirabelle's unremarkable life simply doesn't deserve big screen treatment. Any author other than a Hollywood favorite like Martin likely wouldn't get it done."

In New York, Ken Tucker stated, "The challenge of the movie consists of making you believe that these two people, separated by age and status, could fall in love. Shopgirl succeeds in this with a confidence so sure and serene that you feel through much of the movie as though you’re listening to a fairy tale, an effect enhanced by the voice-over narration provided in soothing tones by Martin-as-Ray."

Susan Wloszczyna of USA Today said, "A serene luminescence surrounds Claire Danes [who]—reduced of late to action drivel (Terminator 3) or bit roles (The Hours)—finally fulfills the potent promise of her mid-90s TV series My So-Called Life. Los Angeles doesn't look half-bad, either. When director Anand Tucker isn't training his camera on the jewel-like traffic lights below or the sparkling cosmos above, he portrays the City of Angels as a haven of spare elegance and urbane stylishness, as if it were Woody Allen's Manhattan but with better weather and inviting outdoor pools. But save for savoring Danes and an L.A. cleansed of gaudy excess, there is little that is truly novel about Shopgirl ... The film ultimately lets Mirabelle down and leaves the viewer dissatisfied. A Lost in Translation drained of its wryly observed humor, Shopgirl is worth a browse. But it isn't always easy to buy."

Awards
 Satellite Award for Best Picture – Musical or Comedy – Nominated
 Satellite Award for Best Adapted Screenplay – Nominated
 Satellite Award for Best Actress – Motion Picture Musical or Comedy (Claire Danes) – Nominated
 Satellite Award for Best Supporting Actor – Motion Picture (Jason Schwartzman) – Nominated
 Costume Designers Guild Award for Best Costume Design – Contemporary Film (Nancy Steiner) – Nominated

References

External links
 
 
 
 
 
 

2005 films
2005 romantic drama films
American romantic drama films
Films about interclass romance
Films with screenplays by Steve Martin
Films based on short fiction
Films set in department stores
Films set in Los Angeles
Films set in Vermont
Films shot in California
Films shot in Los Angeles
Films shot in Washington (state)
20th Century Fox films
Hyde Park Entertainment films
Touchstone Pictures films
Films directed by Anand Tucker
Films based on novellas
2000s English-language films
2000s American films